Alexander Walke (born 6 June 1983) is a German professional football goalkeeper who plays for Austrian Bundesliga club Red Bull Salzburg.

Club career
Born in Oranienburg, Brandenburg, Walke began his career at Energie Cottbus as a 14-year-old. In 1999, he transferred to Werder Bremen, and was called up to the professional team in 2003. After six years, Walke moved to Baden-Württemberg in 2005 from Werder Bremen to join SC Freiburg. In 2008, he transferred to SV Wehen Wiesbaden. Walke left SV Wehen Wiesbaden to the end of the 2008–09 season. On 28 May 2009, he signed a two-year contract with FC Hansa Rostock where he played in all 36 games.

In 2010, Walke left Germany to sign for Austrian Bundesliga champion FC Red Bull Salzburg. He was the third German-born goalkeeper for the 2010–2011 season behind Niclas Heimann and Gerhard Tremmel. After one year on loan at Greuther Fürth in the 2. Bundesliga he returned to Salzburg for the 2011–12 season taking over the number 1 position from Eddie Gustafsson.

During the 2017-18 season Salzburg had their best ever European campaign.  They finished top of their Europa League group, for a record fourth time, before beating Real Sociedad and Borussia Dortmund thus making their first ever  appearance in the UEFA Europa League semi-final. On 3 May 2018, he played in the Europa League semi-finals as Olympique de Marseille played out a 1–2 away loss but a 3–2 aggregate win to secure a place in the 2018 UEFA Europa League Final.

International career
He competed for Germany at the FIFA World Youth Championship 2003, but tested positive for tetrahydrocannabinol, the active chemical in marijuana.

Career statistics

Honours
Red Bull Salzburg
 Austrian Bundesliga: 2011–12, 2013–14, 2014–15, 2015–16, 2016–17, 2017–18, 2018–19, 2019–20, 2020–21, 2021–22
 Austrian Cup: 2011–12, 2013–14, 2014–15, 2015–16, 2016–17, 2018–19, 2019–20, 2020–21,  2021–22

See also
List of sportspeople sanctioned for doping offences

References

External links
Walke's profile at Kicker.de

1983 births
Living people
People from Oranienburg
Association football goalkeepers
German footballers
Germany under-21 international footballers
Germany youth international footballers
German expatriate footballers
FC Energie Cottbus players
SV Werder Bremen players
SV Werder Bremen II players
SC Freiburg players
FC Hansa Rostock players
SV Wehen Wiesbaden players
FC Red Bull Salzburg players
SpVgg Greuther Fürth players
2. Bundesliga players
Regionalliga players
Oberliga (football) players
Austrian Football Bundesliga players
Doping cases in association football
Expatriate footballers in Austria
Footballers from Brandenburg